Nordhastedt is a municipality in the district of Dithmarschen, in Schleswig-Holstein, Germany.

Notable people
Friedrich Wiese (1892-1975) German Wehrmacht general during World War II

References

Municipalities in Schleswig-Holstein
Dithmarschen